Magnetic ring spinning, magnetic spinning, or innovative spinning is a ring spinning technology for making yarn based on magnetic levitation. This technique functions without a traveler sliding over the ring, enabling much higher spinning rates.

Description 
Ring spinning stands alone as the standard of high quality yarn suitable for any type of textile end product. The main technological limitation of ring spinning lies with the metal/metal contact between the traveler and ring. This contact creates frictional heat and rapid wear, resulting in limitations on production speed, a drop in yarn quality with time.

Magnetic ring spinning design approach is a patented technology  that aims to eliminate the traveler from the ring spinning system and replace it with a magnetically suspended disc that rotates in magnetic field. This new spinning concept, expounded in a 2005 dissertation at Auburn University, Auburn, Alabama, was developed to take advantage of the quality features produced by ring spinning and adding to it the much higher spinning speeds by avoiding the traditional limitations of the traditional system.
Magnetic spinning system mainly consists of a lightweight rotor magnetically suspended  inside a fixed stator (Figure 1). The rotor can spin freely inside the stator. The stator is equipped with electromagnets that always keep the rotor in its central position. The rotor in this configuration replaces the ring and traveller in the traditional spinning system.

See also
 Cotton mill
 Cotton-spinning machinery
 DREF friction spinning
 Magnetic levitation
 Open-end spinning
 Spinning
 Spinning wheel
 Textile manufacturing

References

External links
 A complete spinning website - Describes the blow room, carding, Ring spinning, OE, fibre testing, textile *
 Auburn Theses and Dissertations 
 Design for a Magnetic Levitation System
 AUTEX Research Journal, INNOVATIVE APPROACH TO HIGH-SPEED SPINNING USING A MAGNETICALLY-ELEVATED SPINNING RING An article describes the magnetic ring spinning concept.
 Auburn University, Alabama -Magnetic Ring Spinning Patent
 Ring-spinning system for making yarn having a magnetically elevated ring
 Patent Scope
 Fresh Patents

Spinning
Textile machinery